The Grand Junction Eagles were a collegiate summer baseball team located in Grand Junction, Colorado, founded in 1948, originally sponsored by Eagles Lodge No. 595. The Eagles played many of the best semi-pro teams including the Humboldt Crabs, Alaska Goldpanners, and Anchorage Glacier Pilots, and had multiple appearances in the National Baseball Congress World Series. The Grand Junction Eagles played their last season in 1980. in 1964, the Eagles became the second non-Alaska team to play in the Midnight Sun Game.

Notable alumni
Tippy Martinez (1972), Eric Wilkins, Paul Molitor, Bob Welch, Jim Sundberg, Randy Ready, Bill Evans, Max Alvis, Craig Morton, and Rick Miller.

References

External links
 Grand Junction's Juco World Series
 Grand Junction Eagles semi-pro baseball

Baseball teams in Colorado
Grand Junction, Colorado
1948 establishments in Colorado
Baseball teams established in 1948